Minestrone is a thick soup of Italian origin made with vegetables, often with the addition of pasta or rice, sometimes both. Common ingredients include beans, onions, celery, carrots, leaf vegetables, stock, parmesan cheese and tomatoes.

There is no set recipe for minestrone, since it can usually be made out of whatever vegetables are at one's disposal. It can be vegetarian, contain meat, or contain an animal bone-based stock (such as chicken stock). Food author Angelo Pellegrini claimed that the base of minestrone is bean broth, and that borlotti beans (also called Roman beans) "are the beans to use for genuine minestrone".

History 
Some of the earliest origins of minestrone soup pre-date the expansion of the Latin tribes of Rome into what became the Roman Kingdom (later Roman Republic and Empire), when the local diet was "vegetarian by necessity" and consisted mostly of vegetables, such as onions, lentils, cabbage, garlic, broad beans, mushrooms, carrots, asparagus, and turnips.

During this time, the main dish of a meal would have been pulte, a simple but filling porridge of spelt flour cooked in salt water, to which whatever vegetables that were available would have been added.

It was not until the 2nd century BCE, when Rome had conquered Italy and monopolized the commercial and road networks, that a huge diversity of products flooded the capital and began to change their diet, and by association, the diet of Italy, most notably with the more frequent inclusion of meats, including as a stock for soups.

Spelt flour was also removed from soups, as bread had been introduced into the Roman diet by the Greeks, and pulte became a meal largely for the poor.

The ancient Romans recognized the health benefits of a simple or "frugal" diet (from the Latin fruges, the common name given to cereals, vegetables and legumes) and thick vegetable soups and vegetables remained a staple.

Marcus Apicius's ancient cookbook De Re Coquinaria described polus, a Roman soup dating back to 30 CE made up of farro, chickpeas, and fava beans, with onions, garlic, lard, and greens thrown in.

As eating habits and ingredients changed in Italy, so did minestrone. Apicius updates the pultes and pulticulae with fancy trimmings such as cooked brains and wine.

The tradition of not losing rural roots continues today, and minestrone is now known in Italy as belonging to the style of cooking called "cucina povera" (literally "poor kitchen"), meaning dishes that have rustic, rural roots, as opposed to "cucina nobile", or the cooking style of the aristocracy and nobles.

Etymology 
The word minestrone, meaning a thick vegetable soup, is attested in English from 1871. It is from Italian minestrone, the augmentative form of minestra, "soup", or more literally, "that which is served", from minestrare, "to serve" and cognate with administer as in "to administer a remedy".

Because of its unique origins and the absence of a fixed recipe, minestrone varies widely across Italy depending on traditional cooking times, ingredients, and season. Minestrone ranges from a thick and dense texture with very boiled-down vegetables, to a more brothy soup with large quantities of diced and lightly cooked vegetables; it may also include meats.

In modern Italian there are three words corresponding to the English word soup: zuppa, which is used in the sense of tomato soup, or fish soup; minestra, which is used in the sense of a more substantial soup such as a vegetable soup, and also for "dry" soups, namely pasta dishes; and minestrone, which means a very substantial or large soup or stew, though the meaning has now come to be associated with this particular dish.

Regional variations 
Minestrone alla Genovese is a variant typical of Liguria, which contains greater use of herbs, including pesto.

Minestra is a variant from Malta, which prominently features kunserva (a thick tomato paste), potatoes, kohlrabi, cauliflower, and sometimes spaghetti.

Imbakbaka or Mbakbaka, is a type of stew in Libya made with pasta, chickpeas, Bzar spice, and meat. It originated through colonization from the Italian Empire.

See also 

 Pasta e fagioli
 List of Italian soups
 List of legume dishes
 List of soups
 List of vegetable soups

References 

Italian cuisine
Maltese cuisine
Italian soups
Italian inventions
Vegetable soups